The 1970 European Athletics Indoor Championships were held in 1970 at Wiener Stadthalle, Vienna, the capital of Austria, between 14–15 March 1970. It replaced the European Indoor Games, an indoor athletics competition which had been held since 1966.

Medal summary

Men

Women

Medal table

Participating nations

 (21)
 (6)
 (7)
 (14)
 (4)
 (15)
 (4)
 (21)
 (12)
 (1)
 (8)
 (3)
 (8)
 (3)
 (7)
 (26)
 (10)
 (44)
 (8)
 (7)
 (5)
 (4)
 (33)
 (8)

References
 Results - men at GBRathletics.com
 Results - women at GBRathletics.com
 Results at Todor
 EAA

 
European Athletics Indoor Championships
European Indoor Championships
European Athletics Indoor Championships
A
A
1970s in Vienna
March 1970 sports events in Europe